The San Augustine County Courthouse and Jail is a historic courthouse located at the corner of Main and Broadway in San Augustine, Texas.  The structure was designed by architect Shirley Simons and built in 1927 by the firm of Campbell and White.  The courthouse has an exterior facade made of Texas lueders limestone with green Ludowicki tile on the roof and matching trim.  The building reflects a Classical Revival style of architecture.  The building includes one of the largest courtrooms in East Texas, featuring two-story Palladian-style windows.  A statue of James Pinckney Henderson, the first Governor of Texas, was installed in front of the courthouse in 1937.   The courthouse was listed on the National Register of Historic Places in 2004.  The listing included two contributing buildings and one contributing object.  The Texas Historical Commission provided San Augustine County with a $3.7 million grant to restore the courthouse.

See also

National Register of Historic Places listings in San Augustine County, Texas
Recorded Texas Historic Landmarks in San Augustine County

References

External links

Courthouses on the National Register of Historic Places in Texas
Neoclassical architecture in Texas
Government buildings completed in 1909
Buildings and structures in San Augustine County, Texas
Jails on the National Register of Historic Places in Texas
National Register of Historic Places in San Augustine County, Texas
Jails in Texas
Historic district contributing properties in Texas